Hoak Media Corporation was a broadcast media company based in Dallas, Texas. Hoak once owned eighteen television stations (including satellites), all in medium and small-markets, mostly in the Great Plains states and Colorado. Hoak Media was established in August 2003.

On November 20, 2013, Gray Television announced that it would purchase Hoak Media and Parker Broadcasting, excluding KREX (and its satellites), KFQX and WMBB (which could not be sold to Gray as it already owned stations in the markets affected), and as well as KAUZ-TV. Some of Hoak's stations were originally going to be sold to Excalibur Broadcasting and they would have been operated by Gray under local marketing agreements. On December 19, it was announced that KREX and WMBB would be sold to Nexstar Broadcasting Group, while KFQX would be sold to Mission Broadcasting.

The sale was completed on June 13, 2014. However, some stations were forced to go off the air and their programming was moved to subchannels of Gray-owned stations (and in Hastings, Nebraska, from KHAS-TV to KSNB-TV with KSNB-TV's existing programming moving to a subchannel), due to some stations unable to receive regulatory approval after the FCC's then-recent ruling on joint sales agreements. Those silent stations were later sold off to minority interests.

On August 10, 2015, Hoak announced it would sell its last remaining station, KAUZ-TV (which was not included in the sale of most of Hoak's other stations to Gray Television, and of which was originally going to be sold to KAUZ Media, Inc.), to American Spirit Media (a Charlotte, North Carolina-based company headed by Thomas B. Henson) and would be operated under a shared services agreement by Raycom Media as a result of that company's acquisition of Drewry Communications (which had operated KAUZ-TV under a joint sales agreement since 2009). The sale was completed on December 1, completing the disestablishment of Hoak.

List of stations formerly owned by Hoak
Stations are arranged alphabetically by state and by city of license.

Carriage with Dish Network
On June 5, 2012, all of Hoak's stations were pulled from Dish Network after they failed to renew a carriage agreement. The refusal to renew reportedly surrounds Dish Network's "Hopper" digital video recorder and its controversial commercial-skipping feature AutoHopwhich has also led to complaints from the major U.S. television networks. Dish Network's senior vice president of programming scolded the company for its decision to pull its channels from the service, believing that their decision disrespects "customer control" over programming.

Notes

References 

Defunct television broadcasting companies of the United States
American companies established in 2003
Mass media companies disestablished in 2015
Companies based in Dallas
2015 disestablishments in Texas
2014 mergers and acquisitions
2015 mergers and acquisitions
Defunct companies based in Texas
Gray Television